Sweden competed at the 2020 Summer Olympics in Tokyo. Originally scheduled to take place from 24 July to 9 August 2020, the Games were postponed to 23 July to 8 August 2021, because of the COVID-19 pandemic. Swedish athletes have competed at every Summer Olympic Games, with the exception of the 1904 Summer Olympics in St. Louis. 

Winning gold in three events, it was the most gold medals won by Sweden in the Summer Olympics since the 2004 Games in Athens. The overall 9 medal haul was lower than the three preceding Olympic Games however. With Daniel Ståhl and Simon Pettersson winning gold and silver respectively in Men's discus throw, it was the first double for Sweden in an athletics event since the 1948 Olympics.

Medalists

Competitors
The following is the list of number of competitors participating in the Games.

SOC lists 138 participants on their webpage. Their count includes Emilia Fahlin in road cycling who withdrew due to lack of form before the games started and Jon Persson, reserve in men's table tennis team.

Archery

One Swedish archer qualified for the women's individual recurve by securing one of three remaining spots available in the secondary tournament at the 2019 World Archery Championships in 's-Hertogenbosch, Netherlands. Christine Bjerendal was selected on July 8, 2021.

Athletics

Swedish athletes further achieved the entry standards, either by qualifying time or by world ranking, in the following track and field events (up to a maximum of 3 athletes in each event):

On 20 November 2019, race walker Perseus Karlström, world discus throw champion Daniel Ståhl, and American-born pole vaulter Armand Duplantis were officially named to the first batch of nominated Swedish athletes for the Games, with two-time Olympians Kim Amb (men's javelin throw) and Angelica Bengtsson (women's pole vault) joining them as part of the next batch two months later. Seven additional athletes were added to the nation's athletics roster for the Games on 24 March 2021, with marathon runner Carolina Wikström joining them one month later. Meraf Bahta and Sarah Lahti were added to the squad June 10th. The athletics squad was completed with the addition of five athletes on 30 June 2021 and one final athlete on July 8th. 

Track & road events
Men

Women

Field events
Men

Women

Badminton

Sweden entered one badminton player in men's singles based on the BWF Race to Tokyo Rankings as of 25 May 2021. Felix Burestedt was selected by SOC in May 2021.

Boxing

Agnes Alexiusson qualified for a spot in the women's lightweight division at the 2020 European Qualification Tournament in Villebon-sur-Yvette, France. She was selected for the games by SOC a few days later, on June 10th. Adam Chartoi was added June 30th.

Canoeing

Slalom
Sweden qualified one canoeist for the men's K-1 class by finishing in the top eighteen at the 2019 ICF Canoe Slalom World Championships in La Seu d'Urgell, Spain. Erik Holmer was selected in June 2021.

Sprint
Sweden qualified a single boat in the women's K-1 500 m for the Games by finishing sixth in the final race at the 2019 ICF Canoe Sprint World Championships in Szeged, Hungary. On 20 November 2019, Rio 2016 kayaker Linnea Stensils was officially selected to the Swedish roster for the Games, with Petter Menning joining her in May 2021.

Qualification Legend: QF = Qualify to quarterfinal; SF = Qualify to semifinal; FA = Qualify to final (medal); FB = Qualify to final B (non-medal)

Cycling

Road
Sweden qualified one rider each to compete in the men's and women's Olympic road race, by virtue of his top 50 national finish (for men) and her top 100 individual finish (for women) in the UCI World Ranking. Two-time Olympian Emilia Fahlin was officially selected to the Swedish roster for the Games in April 2021. A week before the Games started, she withdrew due to not being in sufficiently good form to be able to compete for a medal.

Mountain biking
Sweden qualified one female mountain biker, based on the 2019 UCI Mountain Bike World Championships. Reigning Olympic champion Jenny Rissveds was selected in May 2021.

Diving

Emma Gullstrand qualified through her placement in women's springboard at the 2021 FINA Diving World Cup in Tokyo, Japan. She was selected by SOC on June 30th 2021.

Equestrian

Swedish equestrians qualified a full squad each in the team dressage and jumping competitions by virtue of a top-six finish at the 2018 FEI World Equestrian Games in Tryon, North Carolina, United States. The eventing riders were added to the squad by winning the bronze medal and finishing second among those eligible for Olympic qualification at the 2019 European Championships in Luhmühlen, Germany. Four athletes, including one reserve, were selected by the SOC for the jumping events on June 21, 2021. Dressage and eventing teams, including reserves as well, were selected by the SOC on June 28, 2021.

Dressage
Antonia Ramel and Brother de Jeu have been named the traveling alternates. Antonia Ramel got called up following the withdrawal of Patrik Kittel due to a horse injury two days prior to the competition.

Qualification Legend: Q = Qualified for the final; q = Qualified for the final as a lucky loser

Eventing
Sara Algotsson Ostholt and Chicuelo have been named the traveling alternates.

(s) – substituted before cross-country – 20 replacement penalties

Jumping
Rolf-Göran Bengtsson and Ermindo W have been named the traveling alternates.

Football

Summary

Women's tournament

Sweden women's national football team qualified for the Games by securing a top-three finish among UEFA teams at the 2019 FIFA Women's World Cup in France, defeating Rio 2016 champion Germany in the quarterfinal round to reach the semifinals.

Team roster

Group play

Quarterfinal

Semifinal

Gold-medal match

Golf

Sweden entered four golfers (two per gender) into the Olympic tournament. Alex Norén and Henrik Norlander qualified directly among the top 60 eligible players for the individual event based on the IGF World Rankings. Female golfers Anna Nordqvist and Madelene Sagström were added on 30 June 2021.

Gymnastics

Artistic
Sweden entered two artistic gymnasts into the Olympic competition. David Rumbutis and London 2012 Olympian Jonna Adlerteg received a spare berth each from the men's and women's apparatus events, respectively, as one of the highest-ranked gymnasts, neither part of the team nor qualified directly through the all-around, at the 2019 World Championships in Stuttgart, Germany.

Men

Women

Handball

Summary

Men's tournament

Sweden men's national handball team qualified for the Olympics by securing a top-two finish at the Berlin leg of the 2020 IHF Olympic Qualification Tournament.

Team roster

Group play

Quarterfinal

Women's tournament

Sweden women's national handball team qualified for the Olympics by securing a top-two finish at the Llíria leg of the 2020 IHF Olympic Qualification Tournament.

Team roster

Group play

Quarterfinal

Semifinal

Bronze medal game

Judo

Four Swedish athletes have qualified in judo based on the world rankings released in June 2021. The Swedish Olympic Committee selected athletes Tommy Macias, in men's 73 kg, Marcus Nyman in men's 90 kg and Anna Bernholm, in women's 70 kg, in advance as they expected them to qualify. Robin Pacek in men's 81 kg was added to the squad in June 2021.

Rowing

Sweden qualified one boat in the women's single sculls for the Games by finishing fourth in the A-final and securing the last of three berths available at the 2021 FISA European Olympic Qualification Regatta in Varese, Italy.

Qualification Legend: FA=Final A (medal); FB=Final B (non-medal); FC=Final C (non-medal); FD=Final D (non-medal); FE=Final E (non-medal); FF=Final F (non-medal); SA/B=Semifinals A/B; SC/D=Semifinals C/D; SE/F=Semifinals E/F; QF=Quarterfinals; R=Repechage

Sailing

Swedish sailors qualified one boat in each of the following classes through the 2018 Sailing World Championships, the class-associated Worlds, and the continental regattas. 

On 20 November 2019, the Swedish Olympic Committee (SOK) officially selected the first three sailors to compete at the Tokyo 2020 regatta, namely London 2012 champion and Finn yachtsman Max Salminen and 470 crew members Fredrik Bergström and Anton Dahlberg. Dinghy sailors Jesper Stålheim (Laser) and Josefin Olsson (Laser Radial) were named to the second batch of nominated Swedish athletes for the Games on 31 January 2020. Nacra 17 crew Cecilia Jonsson and Emil Järudd joined them in April 2021, with the women's 470 crew (Bergström and Karlsson) completing the Swedish sailing squad one month later.

Men

Women

Mixed

M = Medal race; EL = Eliminated – did not advance into the medal race

Shooting

Swedish shooters achieved quota places for the following events by virtue of their best finishes at the 2018 ISSF World Championships, the 2019 ISSF World Cup series, European Championships or Games, and European Qualifying Tournament, as long as they obtained a minimum qualifying score (MQS) by 31 May 2020. On 20 November 2019, skeet shooter and two-time Olympian Stefan Nilsson was officially selected to the Swedish roster for the Games.

Skateboarding

Oskar Rozenberg Hallberg qualified for the games by finishing top 16 in the Olympic world skateboarding rankings for men's park. The Swedish Olympic Committee selected him for the games in late May 2021.

Swimming

Swedish swimmers further achieved qualifying standards in the following events (up to a maximum of 2 swimmers in each event at the Olympic Qualifying Time (OQT), and potentially 1 at the Olympic Selection Time (OST)):

On 20 November 2019, multiple Olympic medalist and current world record holder Sarah Sjöström was officially selected to the Swedish roster for the Games, with fellow swimmers Louise Hansson (women's 100 m butterfly) and Erik Persson (men's 200 m breaststroke) joining her as part of the next batch two months later. Four more swimmers, including Rio 2016 Olympians Michelle Coleman and Sophie Hansson - were added to the squad in May 2021 based on their performances at the 2021 European Championships. Björn Seeliger in men's 50m freestyle, and Sara Junevik for the women's 4x100m freestyle relay team, were added to the Swedish swimming squad on June 30th 2021. Victor Johansson, participating in the men's 800 and 1500 m freestyle, was the last addition to the squad, added on July 8th 2021.

Men

Women

 Swimmers who participated in the heats only.

Table tennis

Sweden entered four athletes into the table tennis competition at the Games. The men's team secured a berth by advancing to the quarterfinal round of the 2020 World Olympic Qualification Event in Gondomar, Portugal, permitting a maximum of two starters to compete in the men's singles tournament. Meanwhile, Linda Bergström scored a second-match final triumph to book one of the five available places in the women's singles at the 2021 ITTF World Qualification Tournament in Doha, Qatar.

On 20 November 2019, table tennis player Mattias Falck was officially selected to the Swedish roster for the Games. In May 2021, Anton Källberg and Kristian Karlsson were also selected, and Jon Persson was listed as the reserve to the men's team. Christina Källberg was added to the squad in June 2021.

Tennis

Rebecca Peterson qualified for women's singles based on the world ranking released in June 2021. The Swedish Olympic Committee had selected her in advance as they expected her to qualify.

Weightlifting

Swedish weightlifters qualified for one quota places at the games, based on the Tokyo 2020 Rankings Qualification List of 11 June 2021. Patricia Strenius was selected to the squad in June 2021.

Wrestling

Sweden qualified three wrestlers for each of the following classes into the Olympic competition. Two of them finished among the top six to book Olympic spots in the men's Greco-Roman 77 kg and women's freestyle (62 and 68 kg) at the 2019 World Championships, while an additional license was awarded to the Swedish wrestler, who progressed to the top two finals of the women's freestyle 53 kg at the 2021 European Olympic Qualification Tournament in Budapest, Hungary.

On 20 November 2019, Greco-Roman wrestling rookie Alex Bjurberg Kessidis and freestyle wrestler Henna Johansson were officially selected to the Swedish roster for the Games. Johansson's teammate and Rio 2016 bronze medalist Jenny Fransson was permanently removed from the team for the Games after testing positive for the banned steroid methyltestosterone.

Freestyle

Greco-Roman

See also
 Sweden at the 2020 Summer Paralympics

References

Nations at the 2020 Summer Olympics
2020
2021 in Swedish sport